The 2022 Euro Beach Soccer League was the 25th edition of the Euro Beach Soccer League (EBSL), the annual, premier competition in European beach soccer contested between men's national teams. It was organised by Beach Soccer Worldwide (BSWW), in a league and play-off format.

This season, the competing teams continued to take part in two divisions: the top tier (Division A) and the bottom tier (Division B). Division A shrunk from 12 to 10 teams; nine teams returned from last season, plus Estonia who were promoted, meanwhile two teams did not compete due to bans. Division B accommodated 12 nations: those who did not gain promotion from last season, two debuting countries (Malta and Latvia), and teams returning after an absence from competing in recent years.

This season's format was altered considerably compared to the usual programme. All teams in Division A played together across five matchdays. The eight best teams advanced to the post-season event, the Superfinal, but only the top four competed for the EBSL title itself. The teams of Division B entered straight into the Promotion Final to try to earn a spot in Division A next year; no team was relegated this year, whilst the top four were guaranteed promotion to Division A, rather than the usual one, because the top tier is being expanded to 16 teams for 2023.

The league also acted as the qualification route to the 2023 European Games; the top six teams of the Superfinal plus the Promotion Final winners qualified to join hosts Poland.

The Promotion Final was won by Moldova who were promoted to Division A for the first time alongside Kazakhstan, whilst Greece and Turkey also earned promotion. Portugal were the three-time defending champions and were looking for a record fourth straight title, but were beaten in the final by Switzerland who claimed their second title, following their maiden crown ten years prior in 2012.

Division A

Calendar

Teams 
Of the 12 nations who earnt Division A status at the end of last season, 10 entered into this season's top tier as follows (The numbers in parentheses show the European ranking of each team prior to the start of the season, out of 34 nations):

  (1st)
  (2nd)
  (3rd)
  (4th)
  (5th)
  (6th)

  (7th)
  (8th)
  (9th)
  (10th)
  (12th)
  (15th)

 a: In accordance with sanctions imposed by FIFA and UEFA in response to the 2022 Russian invasion of Ukraine, the Russian national team was banned from entering.
 b: Did not enter; reported by media as excluded due to Belarus' role in the 2022 Russian invasion of Ukraine.
 P: Promoted from Division B at the end of the 2021 season.

Regular season

Group 1

Group 2

Awards
The following awards were presented after the conclusion of the first round of matches in Nazaré.

Superfinal

Consolation

9th place match

5th–8th place

5th–8th place semi-finals

Seventh place match

Fifth place match

Final four

Semi-finals

Third place match

Superfinal match

Awards

Winners trophy

Individual awards

Final standings

Top scorers
The following table lists the top 10 scorers in Division A, including goals scored across both the regular season and post season matches.

Sources: Matchdays 1–3, Matchdays 4–5 and Superfinal

Division B

Calendar

Teams 
The following teams entered Division B this season (The numbers in parentheses show the European ranking of each team prior to the start of the season, out of 34 nations):

England returned after a one-season absence. Having originally expressed intentions to compete as far back as 2004, Malta finally made their first appearance in the competition. Czech Republic, Sweden, Bulgaria and Slovakia were also among the preliminary list of participants, but ultimately did not enter; the first did not feature for the first time since their 2007 debut.

  (11th)
  (14th)
  (16th)
  (17th)
  (18th)
  (19th)

  (20th)
  (21st)
  (23rd)
  (28th)
  (29th)
  (n/a)

 R: Relegated from Division A at the end of the 2021 season.
 c.: Team making their debut.

Promotion Final 
The best four teams earn promotion to Division A for the 2023 season.

Group stage

Group A

Group B

Group C

Play-offs

9th–12th place

9th–12th place semi-finals

Eleventh place match

Ninth place match

5th–8th place

5th–8th place semi-finals

Seventh place match

Fifth place match

1st–4th place

Semi-finals

Third place match

Final

Awards
The following were presented after the conclusion of the final day's matches.

Final standings
The top four teams were promoted to Division A, rather than the usual one team, because the top tier is being expanded to 16 teams next season.

Winners Moldova and fourth placed Kazakhstan were promoted for the first time. Turkey were immediately promoted back to the top tier having been relegated in 2021. Greece return to Division A for the first time in six years since their relegation in 2017.

By winning the event, Moldova also earned qualification to the men's beach soccer competition at the 2023 European Games in Poland.

 Kazakhstan were ineligible to qualify to the European Games as they are not a member of the European Olympic Committees. In the event they were to win the Promotion Final, the next highest ranked eligible team would qualify in their place.

Top scorers
The following table lists the top 10 scorers in Division B.

Source

See also
2022 Women's Euro Beach Soccer League

References

External links
Beach Soccer Worldwide, official website

Euro Beach Soccer League
Euro Beach Soccer League
Euro Beach Soccer League
Euro Beach Soccer League
Euro Beach Soccer League
Euro Beach Soccer League
Euro Beach Soccer League
Euro Beach Soccer League
Beach soccer at the 2023 European Games